Sure & Steadfast is a studio album by King Creosote, released in 2013. The album was recorded and released to raise money for the Scottish Fisheries Museum, based in Anstruther.

Track listing
Cicero Had An Anchor Tattoo       
Bodes Unwell       
Third Party       
An Ode To Falling Overboard       
Salt Eyed At The Bathing Pool       
Ounces   
The Grime Reaper       
Easojuly       
Proverbial Pine     
Carry On Dancing       
Precious Lord; We Have An Anchor

References

2013 albums
King Creosote albums